Ponterwyd is a village in Ceredigion, Wales.

Historical background
Ponterwyd's rich history is evident throughout the village. At the village's heart lies Yr Hen Bont, a steep single arch late 18th-century stone bridge, which is adjacent to a late Georgian chapel. Buildings in Ponterwyd range in date from the Georgian period to the 1980s, when a development of bungalows named 'Penlon' was added to the village.

The village is the home of "Bwlch Nant yr Arian", a Natural Resources Wales centre where up to 150 red kites are fed daily.

The village pub," The George Borrow Hotel", is named after writer George Borrow who travelled through Wales on foot in the 1860s.

Notable people
John Rhys was born at Ponterwyd

References

External links

www.geograph.co.uk : photos of Penterwyd and surrounding area

Villages in Ceredigion